Schirach or Šěrach is a noble family of Sorbian (i.e. West Slavic) origin. Many family members were noted as theologians, lawyers, historians, writers and artists from the 17th century, and several family members have also been noted for their efforts to preserve the Sorbian language. The family was raised to the hereditary Austrian nobility in 1776. Family members are resident in Germany and, since the 19th century, the United States.

History

The name Šěrach is assumed to be derived from the Sorbian word šěrak, meaning "greybeard" or "greyhead," in the sense of "old man" or possibly "wise man." Schirach is a Germanized spelling.

The family's earliest known ancestor George Schirag was a farmer in Schiedel near Kamenz, and is mentioned in 1485. One of his descendants, Peter Schirach (Pětr Šěrach) (1656–1727) became a theologian and parish priest in Kreba (Chrjebja). He had three sons who also became theologians, among them Christian Gottlob Schirach (Křesćan Bohuchwał Šěrach) (1709–1776), who was parish priest in Holzkirch and Tiefenfurth.

Christian Gottlob Schirach was the father of Gottlob Benedikt von Schirach (Bohuchwał Benedikt ze Šěrach) (1743–1804), a noted historian, Professor of Philosophy, publisher of the Political Journal (Politisches Journal) and later a diplomat in Danish service, who was ennobled in the Habsburg monarchy on 17 May 1776. His son Karl Benedict von Schirach (born 1790) was a lawyer and writer in Germany, before he emigrated to the United States in 1855. His son Karl Friedrich von Schirach was a major in the US Army, fought in the American Civil War on the Union side and was an honour guard at President Abraham Lincoln's funeral in 1865. Karl Friedrich von Schirach married Elisabeth Baily Norris, a member of a prominent Philadelphia family. Their son was the theatre director Carl Baily Norris von Schirach (1873–1948), who married Emma Middleton Lynah Tillou (1872–1944), who also belonged to a prominent Philadelphia family and who was descended from a signatory of the American Declaration of Independence, a former Governor of Pennsylvania and some of the Mayflower pilgrims. Carl von Schirach was born in Germany, but was an American citizen until joining the Prussian Army. He left the army in 1908 to become leader of the Weimar Court Theatre. Carl von Schirach and Emma Tillou were the parents of the opera singer Rosalind von Schirach and of the politician Baldur Benedikt von Schirach, who was leader of the Hitler Youth until 1940 and who was married to Henriette von Schirach. Henriette von Schirach was one of the few people known to have challenged the persecution of Jews to Hitler personally, after which the couple fell into disfavour in the Nazi leadership. They were the parents of lawyer Klaus von Schirach (born 1935), Munich businessman Robert von Schirach (1938–1980) and author and sinologist Richard von Schirach (born 1942). Robert von Schirach is the father of the lawyer and bestselling crime writer Ferdinand von Schirach (born 1964). Richard von Schirach is the father of the writer and philosopher Ariadne von Schirach (born 1978) and of the novelist Benedict Wells (born Benedict von Schirach 1984).

In the 18th century, family members took an active interest in preservation of the Sorbian language, the Slavic language native to the people the family belonged to, which is closely related to Polish and Czech. One family member, Karl Gottlob Schirach (Korla Bohuchwał Šěrach) (1764–1836), published the first magazine in the Sorbian language, Měsačne pismo k rozwučenju a wokřewjenju.

References

Literature 
 Gothaisches Genealogisches Taschenbuch, B, 1907
 Genealogisches Handbuch des Adels, Adelige Häuser B, Vol. XIV, pp. 460f., Vol 78 (Gesamtreihe), C. A. Starke Verlag, Limburg (Lahn) 1981, .
 Genealogisches Handbuch des Adels, Adelslexikon Band XII, Vol. 125 (Gesamtreihe), C. A. Starke Verlag, Limburg (Lahn), 2001, .
 Kurzer Entwurf einer Oberlausitz-wendischen Kirchenhistorie, Budissin, 1767.
 Hermann Konrad Eggers, Die Schirach und von Schirach, in: Vierteljahresschrift für Heraldik, Sphragistik und Genealogie Nr. 7 (1879), Berlin
 Max von Schirach, Geschichte der Familie von Schirach, Berlin 1939.
 Gottlieb Friedrich Otto, Lexikon der seit dem 15. Jahrhunderte verstorbenen und jetzt lebenden oberlausitzischen Schriftsteller und Künstler, Görlitz 1800–03. ND Hildesheim 1983
 Jan Brankačk/Frido Mětšk, Geschichte der Sorben, Vol. 1, Von den Anfängen bis 1789, VEB Domowina Bautzen, 1977
 Deutsche Biographische Enzyklopädie [published by W.Killy & R.Vierhaus] vol.8. Darmstadt 1998
 
 Michael H. Kater, https://books.google.com/books?id=v9xJPe0QchcC&pg=PA17&lpg=PA17 Hitler Youth. Cambridge: Harvard University Press, 2004. , . S. 17. (Zur Genealogie von Karl Benedict von Schirach bis Baldur von Schirach)

 
German noble families
Sorbian people